Robert L. Bonner (born April 1, 1894) was an American baseball infielder in the Negro leagues. He played from 1923 to 1926 with several teams.

References

External links
 and Baseball-Reference Black Baseball stats and Seamheads  

Cleveland Browns (baseball) players
Cleveland Elites players
Cleveland Tate Stars players
St. Louis Stars (baseball) players
Toledo Tigers players
Baseball players from Tennessee
Baseball infielders
1894 births
People from Fayetteville, Tennessee
Year of death unknown